Bebelis is a genus of beetles in the family Cerambycidae, first described by James Thomson in 1864.

Species 
Bebelis contains the following species:
 Bebelis acuta Pascoe, 1875
 Bebelis aurulenta (Belon, 1903)
 Bebelis coenosa (Bates, 1866)
 Bebelis compta Galileo & Martins, 2006
 Bebelis cuprina (Belon, 1903)
 Bebelis divaricata (Fisher, 1947)
 Bebelis elongata (Lameere, 1893)
 Bebelis fasciata (Fisher, 1947)
 Bebelis furcula (Bates, 1880)
 Bebelis imitatrix Santos-Silva, 2022
 Bebelis leo Monne & Monne, 2009
 Bebelis lignea (Bates, 1866)
 Bebelis lignosa Thomson, 1864
 Bebelis longipennis (Bates, 1885)
 Bebelis maculata Martins & Galileo, 1999
 Bebelis mexicana (Bates, 1885)
 Bebelis modesta (Belon, 1903)
 Bebelis nearnsi Santos-Silva, 2022
 Bebelis obliquata Breuning, 1940
 Bebelis occulta (Bates, 1866)
 Bebelis parana Santos-Silva, 2022
 Bebelis parva (Fisher, 1938)
 Bebelis picta Pascoe, 1875
 Bebelis pseudolignosa Breuning, 1942
 Bebelis puncticollis (Fisher, 1947)
 Bebelis skillmani Santos-Silva, 2022
 Bebelis tagua Galileo & Martins, 2006
 Bebelis tinga Santos-Silva, 2022
 Bebelis wappesi Santos-Silva, 2022
 Bebelis zeteki (Fisher, 1947)

References

 
Apomecynini
Cerambycidae genera